Nani Ardeshir Palkhivala (16 January 1920 – 11 December 2002) was an Indian jurist and liberal economist.

Early years 

Nani Palkhivala was born in 1920 in Bombay in what was then the Bombay Presidency. His family name derives from the profession of his forefathers (a common practice among Parsis), who had been manufacturers of palanquins ("palkhis").

He was educated at Masters Tutorial High School, and later at St. Xavier's College, both in Bombay. He was reported to have had a stammer. At college, he earned a master's degree in English language and literature.

Upon graduating, Palkhivala applied for a position as lecturer at Bombay University, but was not awarded the post. Soon he found himself trying to obtain admission to institutions of higher learning to further his academic career. It being late in the term, most courses were closed, so he enrolled at Government Law College, Bombay.

Entry to the bar 

Nani Palkhivala was called to the bar in 1946 and served in the chambers of the legendary Sir Jamshedji Behramji Kanga in Bombay. He gained a reputation as an eloquent barrister. and was often the center of attention in court, where students of law and younger members of the bar association would go to watch him. 

Palkhivala's initial focus was commercial and tax law. Together with Sir Jamshedji, he authored what was then and still is considered to be an authoritative reference tool for tax professionals: The Law and Practice of Income Tax. Palkhivala was 30 years old at the time of the first printing. Sir Jamshedji later admitted that the credit for this work belonged exclusively to Palkhivala.

Palkhivala's first participation in a case of constitutional significance occurred in 1951, where he served as junior counsel in the case Nusserwanji Balsara vs. State of Bombay [(1951) Bom 210], assisting the esteemed Sir Noshirwan Engineer in challenging several provisions of the Bombay Prohibition Act. Before the year was out, Palkhivala was arguing cases himself, but his first case of constitutional importance (a challenge of the validity of land requisition acts) was lost before the Bombay High Court.

By 1954, barely 10 years after his admission to the bar, Palkhivala was arguing before the Supreme Court. It was in his first case before this court (concerning the interpretation of Article 29(2) and Article 30 of the Indian Constitution, which regulate the rights of religious minorities) that he articulated his (later) famous statements on the inviolate nature of the constitution.

To amend or not to amend 

Palkhivala had a deep respect, indeed reverence, for both the Constitution of India, and for the cardinal principles he saw embedded in it: "The Constitution was meant to impart such a momentum to the living spirit of the rule of law that democracy and civil liberty may survive in India beyond our own times and in the days when our place will know us no more."

Nani saw the constitution as a legacy that had to be honoured while simultaneously being flexible. Quoting Thomas Jefferson, he said, the constitution must go "hand in hand with the progress of the human mind". He was however a firm opponent of politically motivated constitutional amendments (His favourite quotation was from Joseph Story, who said: "The Constitution has been reared for immortality, if the work of man may justly aspire to such a title. It may, nevertheless, perish in an hour by the folly, or corruption, or negligence of its only keepers, the people.").

The culmination of Palkhivala's success before the Supreme Court came in the famous Kesavananda Bharati vs. The State of Kerala case [AIR 1973 S.C. 1461, (1973) 4 SCC 225]:

Parliament had added the Ninth Schedule to the Constitution through the very first constitutional amendment in 1951 as a means of immunizing certain laws against judicial review. Under the provisions of Article 31, which themselves were amended several times later, laws placed in the Ninth Schedule could not be challenged in a court of law on the ground that they violated the fundamental rights of citizens. The protective umbrella covered more than 250 laws passed by state legislatures with the aim of regulating the size of land holdings and abolishing various tenancy systems. The Ninth Schedule was created with the primary objective of preventing the judiciary – which upheld the citizens' right to property on several occasions – from derailing the Nehru government's agenda for land reform, but it outlived its original purpose.

In the now famous ruling, on 24 April 1973, a Special Bench comprising 13 Judges of the Supreme Court of India ruled by a majority of 7–6, that Article 368 of the Constitution "does not enable Parliament to alter the basic structure or framework of the Constitution.". In the process it overruled a decision of a Special Bench of 11 Judges, by a majority of 6–5, on 27 February 1967, that "Parliament has no power to amend Part III of the Constitution so as to take away or abridge the fundamental rights" (I.C. Golak Nath vs. The State of Punjab, AIR 1967 S.C. 1643, (1967) 2 SCJ 486) by stating that no specific provision of the Constitution was immune to amendment, but no amendment could violate the basic structure or inner unity of the Constitution.

The court propounded what has come to be known as the "basic structure" doctrine, which rules that any part of the Constitution may be amended by following the procedure prescribed in Article 368, but no part may be so amended as to "alter the basic structure" of the Constitution.

In 1975, shortly after the imposition of the Indian Emergency, bench of 13 judges was hastily assembled, and presided over by Chief Justice A.N. Ray to determine the degree to which amendments installed by the government of Indira Gandhi were restricted by the Basic Structure theory. By the order of the Chief Justice of 9 November, on 10 November a Bench of 13 Judges commenced hearing of the review of Kesavananda Bharati case. The Bench consisted of Chief Justice A.N. Ray, Justices H.R. Khanna, K.K. Mathew, M.H. Beg, Y.V. Chandrachud, P.N. Bhagwati, V.R. Krishna Iyer, P.K. Goswami, R.S. Sarkaria, A.C. Gupta, N.L. Untwalia, M. Fazal Ali and P.M. Singhal.  On 10 and 11 November, the team of civil libertarian barristers – led by Palkhivala – continuously argued against the Union government's application for reconsideration of the Kesavananda decision. Some of the judges accepted his argument on the very first day, the others on the next; by the end of the second day, the Chief Justice was reduced to a minority of one. On the morning of 12 November, Chief Justice Ray tersely pronounced that the bench was dissolved, and the judges rose.

Post his resignation, Justice H.R. Khanna (a member of the Bench in Kesavananda Review) praised Nani's advocacy in Kesavananda Review case and remarked 'It was not Nani who spoke. It was divinity speaking through him'.
Justice Khanna and other Judges were of the view that ' the heights of eloquence and advocacy reached  by  Palkhivala on these two days were really unparalleled and that Palkhivala's feat would perhaps never be equalled in the Supreme Court'. 

Seven years later, in Minerva Mills Ltd. v. Union of India, [(1980) 3 SCC 625], Palkhivala successfully moved the bench to declare that clause (4) of Article 368 of the Constitution which excludes judicial review of constitutional amendments was unconstitutional.

Defender of rights 

Not only did Nani Palkhivala interpret the constitution as a message of intent but also saw it as a social mandate with a moral dimension. As he later stated in the Privy Purse case Madhav Rao Jivaji Rao Scindia vs Union of India, (1971) 1 SCC 85]: "The survival of our democracy and the unity and integrity of the nation depend upon the realisation that constitutional morality is no less essential than constitutional legality. Dharma (righteousness; sense of public duty or virtue) lives in the hearts of public men; when it dies there, no Constitution, no law, no amendment, can save it."

He was a strong proponent of the rights of freedom of expression and freedom of the press. In an attempt to stifle dissenting opinion, the central government imposed import controls on newsprint in 1972. In the case before the Supreme Court [Bennett Coleman & Co. vs Union of India, (1972) 2 SCC 788], Palkhivala argued that newsprint was more than just a general commodity: "Newsprint does not stand on the same footing as steel. Steel will yield products of steel. Newsprint will manifest whatever is thought of by man."

In the 1970s, state legislation (education is a subject covered by the Concurrent list in the Seventh Schedule of the Indian Constitution – i.e., both central and state governments can legislate on it) was increasingly encroaching on the rights of minority educational institutions which are protected by articles in the Indian constitution. In a landmark case [Ahmedabad St. Xavier's College Society vs. State of Gujarat, (1974) 1 SCC 717], Palkhivala argued that the extant right of a state government to administer an academic institution did not extend to a right to maladminister. The majority of the nine-judge bench upheld his contention, significantly strengthening the rights of the minorities.

Prominent Cases

Major Gen Nilendra Kumar in his book Nani Palkhivala: A Role Model (published by Universal/Lexis Nexis) has listed 140 prominent cases in which Nani appeared, giving the name of  parties, citation, opposite counsels, the name of the judge who delivered the verdict and brief of the law points involved. Notable cases in the list are PJ Irani, Ujjam Bai, Gujarat University, Article 143 matter on immunity of state legislatures, Keshavnanda Bharti case, Birla Cotton, Bank Nationalization, Privy Purses, Harbhajan Singh Dhillon, Bennet Coleman, St Xaviers College, Indira Nehru Gandhi, Minerva Mills, Mandal case and TN Seshan matter of Chief Election Commissioner.

The economist 

Although Nani Palkhivala was one of the leading interpreters of constitutional law and a most ardent defender of the civil liberties guaranteed by the constitution, his legacy also includes 
the aforementioned authoritative book, The Law and Practice of Income Tax, which he co-authored with his mentor Sir Jamshedji Behramji Kanga.

Although anyone who deals with the convoluted mess that is the Indian tax code will invariably regard the work as a primary reference, the tome has also secured international recognition and served as a tax law draft guide at the International Monetary Fund. The first edition was published in 1950 when Palkhivala was only 30 years old, and is still in print today (10th edition in 2014). Sir Jamshedji, who is listed first as author, gracefully acknowledged that the credit belongs to Palkhivala.

Former Attorney-General Soli J. Sorabjee, Nani's friend and colleague for many years, recalls: "His talent in expounding the subject was matched by his genius in explaining the intricacies of the Budget to thousands of his listeners. His famous Annual Budget speeches had humble beginnings in 1958 in a small hall of an old hotel called Green Hotel in Bombay. He spoke without notes and reeled off facts and figures from memory for over an hour keeping his audience in rapt attention."

Describing the Annual Budget meetings, Sorabjee goes on to say: "The audience in these meetings was drawn from industrialists, lawyers, businessmen and the common individual. Nani's speeches were fascinating for their brevity and clarity. His Budget speeches became so popular throughout India and the audience for them grew so large that bigger halls and later the Brabourne Stadium in Bombay had to be booked to keep pace with the demand of an audience of over 20,000. It was aptly said that in those days that there were two Budget speeches, one by the Finance Minister and the other by Nani Palkhivala, and Palkhivala's speech was undoubtedly the more popular and sought after."

Books authored 

 Law and Practice of Income tax
 Taxation in India 
 The Highest Taxed Nation 
 Judiciary Made to Measure 
 Our Constitution Defaced and Defiled 
 India’s Priceless Heritage
 Essential Unity of all Religions
 We, the people
 We, the Nation

Recognition 

Palkhivala received a great deal of recognition from academics, academic institutions and the government.

In 1963, Palkhivala was offered a seat in the Supreme Court, but declined.

In 1968, he was offered the position of Attorney-General by Govinda Menon, then the Law Minister in the Congress Government. Palkhivala recounts in his book We the Nation: "After a great deal of hesitation I agreed. When I was in Delhi I conveyed my acceptance to him, and he told me that the announcement would be made the next day. I was happy that the agonising hours of indecision were over. Sound sleep is one of the blessings I have always enjoyed. That night I went to bed and looked forward to my usual quota of deep slumber. But suddenly and inexplicably, I became wide awake at three o'clock in the morning with the clear conviction, floating like a hook through my consciousness, that my decision was erroneous and that I should reverse it before it was too late. Early in the morning I profusely apologised to the Law Minister for changing my mind. In the years immediately following, it was my privilege to argue on behalf of the citizen, under the same Congress Government and against the government, the major cases which have shaped and moulded [...] constitutional law[...]"

Nani Palkhivala was appointed Indian Ambassador to the United States in 1977 by the Janata government (the first non-Congress Government in India) headed by Morarji Desai and served in the capacity till 1979. He received honorary doctorates from Princeton University, Rutgers University, Lawrence University, University of Wisconsin–Madison, Annamalai University, Ambedkar Law University and the University of Mumbai. The laudation from Princeton called him "... Defender of constitutional liberties, champion of human rights ...", and stated, "he has courageously advanced his conviction that expediency in the name of progress, at the cost of freedom, is no progress at all, but retrogression. Lawyer, teacher, author, and economic developer, he brings to us as Ambassador of India intelligence, good humour, experience, and vision for international understanding...."

Final days 

In the last years of his life, Nani Palkhivala was severely affected by what may have been Alzheimer's disease. According to former Attorney-General Soli J. Sorabjee, who had known him for many years, "it was painful to see that a person so eloquent and articulate unable to speak or recognize persons except occasionally in a momentary flash."

Nani was taken critically ill on 7 December 2002, and taken to Jaslok Hospital in Mumbai. He died on 11 December 2002. He was 82.

References

External links

 Palkhivala and The Constitution of India, Soli J. Sorabjee
 Bombay Bar Association: In Memoriam
 The Fundamental Rights Case : Propositions submitted before the Supreme Court by N.A. Palkhivala
 My tryst with the legendary N. A. Palkhivala by H. S. Serna, IRS
 Speech of Nani Palkhivala on 24th–26th Amendments
 When I die ...

1920 births
2002 deaths
Ambassadors of India to the United States
Indian barristers
20th-century Indian economists
20th-century Indian lawyers
Parsi people from Mumbai
University of Mumbai alumni
Recipients of the Padma Vibhushan in public affairs
Scientists from Mumbai
Indian autobiographers
Indian male writers
Politicians from Mumbai
Indian legal writers
Scholars from Mumbai